SilverBirch Studios (2004–2009) was a video game developer founded in 2004 by Kevin Birch in the Greater Toronto Area of Ontario, Canada. SilverBirch developed several mobile games and a handheld game, Metanet Software's N+, for the DS and PSP. N+ showed well at E3 2008 and received IGN.com's Best Platform Game at the conference. N+ was released on August 26, 2008 for the DS and PSP in North America. N+ won IGN Game of the Month for August 2008 for both DS and PSP. As a result of losing external funding, Silverbirch Studios closed January 1, 2009.

References

External links
SilverBirch Studios entry at MobyGames

Video game companies established in 2004
Video game companies disestablished in 2009
Defunct video game companies of Canada
Video game development companies